{{DISPLAYTITLE:C6H6Cl6}}
The molecular formula C6H6Cl6 may refer to:

Hexachlorocyclohexane
alpha-Hexachlorocyclohexane
beta-Hexachlorocyclohexane
gamma-Hexachlorocyclohexane, a.k.a. Lindane, a pesticide
Polyvinylidene chloride